Rungapapa Knoll, also known as Rungapapa Seamount, is a submarine volcano in New Zealand's Bay of Plenty.

The seamount is of Pleistocene age and no eruptions are known to have occurred from it in recorded history. An internal heat source exists inside the volcano.

See also
List of volcanoes in New Zealand

References

External links
Marine Gazetteer Placedetails

Seamounts of New Zealand
Submarine volcanoes
Pleistocene volcanoes
Volcanoes of New Zealand